Water End or Waterend may refer to the following places in England:

Water End, Bedford, Bedfordshire
Water End, Maulden, Central Bedfordshire
Water End, Wrestlingworth, Central Bedfordshire
Waterend, Buckinghamshire
Waterend, Cumbria
Water End, East Riding of Yorkshire
Water End, Essex
Water End, Hampshire
Water End, Dacorum, Hertfordshire
Water End, Welwyn Hatfield, Hertfordshire
Water End Swallow Holes, Hertfordshire
Waterend, Hertfordshire
Waterend, Gloucestershire